This is a list of notable Jewish American politicians, arranged chronologically. For other Jewish Americans, see Lists of Jewish Americans.

Federal government

Members of Congress

Cabinet officials

Cabinet-level officials

State government

Governors

Lieutenant governors

State Attorneys General

State Secretaries of State

State Treasurers

Other State Cabinet Positions

Municipal government

Mayors of major cities

Current mayors of major cities

Former mayors of major cities

Jerry Abramson (D-Louisville, KY: 1986–1999; 2003–2011)
Moses Alexander (D-Boise, ID: 1897–1899; 1901–1903)
Abe Aronovitz (R-Miami, FL: 1953–1955)
Harry Bacharach (R-Atlantic City, NJ: 1912; 1916–1920; 1930–1935)
Walt Bachrach (R-Cincinnati, OH: 1960–1967
Abraham Beame (D-New York, NY: 1974–1977)
Martin Behrman (D-New Orleans, LA: 1904–1920; 1925–1926)
Richard Berkley (R-Kansas City, MO: 1979–1991)
Ethan Berkowitz (D-Anchorage, AK: 2015–2020)
Bruce Blakeman (R-First Presiding Officer of Nassau County, NY)
Michael Bloomberg (D-New York, NY: 2002–2013)
David Cicilline (D-Providence, RI: 2003–2011)
Josh Cohen (D-Annapolis, MD: 2009–2013)
Larry Cohen (D-Saint Paul, MN: 1972–1976)
Norm Coleman (R-Saint Paul, MN: 1997–2002)
Leopold David (Anchorage, AK: 1920–1923), first mayor of Anchorage
Rahm Emanuel (D-Chicago, IL: 2011–2019)
Mutt Evans (D-Durham, NC: 1951–1963)
Bob Filner (D-San Diego, CA: 2012–2013)
Samuel Folz (D-Kalamazoo, MI: 1903)
Lois Frankel (D-West Palm Beach, FL: 2003–2011)
Sandra Freedman (D-Tampa, FL: 1986–1995)
Jeffrey Friedman (D-Austin, TX: 1975–1977)
Eva Galambos (R-Sandy Springs, GA: 2005–2014)
 Eric Garcetti (D-Los Angeles, CA; 2013–2022)
Bailey Gatzert (I-Seattle, WA: 1875–1876)
Susan Golding (R-San Diego, CA: 1992–2000)
Neil Goldschmidt (D-Portland, OR: 1973–1979)
Stephen Goldsmith (R-Indianapolis, IN: 1992–2000)
Phil Gordon (D-Phoenix, AZ: 2004–2012)
Bill Gradison (R-Cincinnati, OH: 1971)
Robert Harris (D-Ann Arbor, MI: 1969–1973)
Adlene Harrison (D-Dallas, TX: 1976)
Julius Houseman (D-Grand Rapids, MI: 1872–1873; 1874–1875)
Vera Katz (D-Portland, OR: 1993–2005)
Ed Koch (D-New York, NY: 1978–1989)
Joseph Lazarow (R-Atlantic City, NJ: 1976–1982)
Henry Loeb (D-Memphis, TN: 1960–1963; 1968–1971), later converted to Episcopalianism
Zachariah J. Loussac (D-Anchorage, AK: 1948–1951)
Sophie Masloff (D-Pittsburgh, PA: 1988–1994)
Sam Massell (D-Atlanta, GA: 1970–1974)
Laura Miller (D-Dallas, TX: 2002–2007)
Arthur Naftalin (D-Minneapolis, MN: 1961–1969)
Meyera Oberndorf (D-Virginia Beach, VA: 1988–2009)
Jonathan Rothschild (D-Tucson, AZ: 2011–2019)
Kel Seliger (R-Amarillo, TX: 1993–2001)
Florence Shapiro (R-Plano, TX: 1990–1992)
Joseph Simon (R-Portland, OR: 1909–1911)
Paul Soglin (D-Madison, WI: 1973–1979; 1989–1997; 2011–2019)
Jerry Springer (D-Cincinnati, OH: 1977–1978)
Annette Strauss (D-Dallas, TX: 1987–1991)
Adolph Sutro (R-San Francisco, CA: 1895–1897)
Susan Weiner (R-Savannah, GA: 1992–1996)
Edward Zorinsky (R-Omaha, NE: 1973–1976)

Other
 Lazarus Joseph (1891–1966), NY State Senator and New York City Comptroller

Presidential and vice presidential candidates
Tonie Nathan was the vice presidential nominee of the Libertarian Party in 1972. She received one electoral vote for vice president (from a faithless elector that had pledged his vote for Republicans Richard Nixon and Spiro Agnew), thus becoming the first Jew to receive an electoral vote for either president or vice president.
Arlen Specter ran for the Republican nomination in 1996, but dropped out before the Iowa caucuses. He later became a Democrat.
Joe Lieberman was the Democratic nominee for vice president in 2000, receiving 266 electoral votes for vice president. Four years later, he ran for the Democratic presidential nomination for the 2004 election. He became an Independent in 2006.
Jill Stein was the Green Party nominee in 2012. She lost with 0.36% of the vote, or 470,000 votes. She ran in the 2016 Presidential Election, but lost with just over one percent.
Bernie Sanders ran for president in 2016 as a Democrat. He became the first Jewish candidate to win a Democratic party primary with a victory in New Hampshire. He lost the nomination to Hillary Clinton. He ran again in 2020. Sanders received one vote in the electoral college in 2016 from David Mulinix of Hawaii, thus making him the first Jew to receive a vote for president in the college. In addition to this, he received two invalidated votes from other voters in the electoral college.
Michael Bennet ran in the 2020 Democratic Party presidential primaries.
Michael Bloomberg ran in the 2020 Democratic Party presidential primaries.
Marianne Williamson, raised in a Jewish family, ran in the 2020 Democratic Party presidential primaries.

See also
List of Jewish political milestones in the United States
List of Jewish American jurists

References

Politicians
Jewish